A Gran plot (also known as Gran titration or the Gran method) is a common means of standardizing a titrate or titrant by estimating the equivalence volume or end point in a strong acid-strong base titration or in a potentiometric titration. Such plots have been also used to calibrate glass electrodes, to estimate the carbonate content of aqueous solutions, and to estimate the Ka values (acid dissociation constants) of weak acids and bases from titration data.

Gran plots use linear approximations of the a priori non-linear relationships between the measured quantity, pH or electromotive potential (emf), and the titrant volume. Other types of concentration measures, such as spectrophotometric absorbances or NMR chemical shifts, can in principle be similarly treated. These approximations are only valid near, but not at, the end point, and so the method differs from end point estimations by way of first- and second-derivative plots, which require data at the end point. Gran plots were originally devised for graphical determinations in pre-computer times, wherein an x-y plot on paper would be manually extrapolated to estimate the x-intercept. The graphing and visual estimation of the end point have been replaced by more accurate least-squares analyses since the advent of modern computers and enabling software packages, especially spreadsheet programs with built-in least-squares functionality.

Basis of the calculations 
The Gran plot is based on the Nernst equation which can be written as
 
where E is a measured electrode potential, E0 is a standard electrode potential, s is the slope, ideally equal to RT/nF, and {H+} is the activity of the hydrogen ion. The expression rearranges to

depending on whether the electrode is calibrated in millivolts or pH. For convenience the concentration, [H+], is used in place of activity. In a titration of strong acid with strong alkali, the analytical concentration of the hydrogen ion is obtained from the initial concentration of acid, Ci and the amount of alkali added during titration.

where vi is the initial volume of solution, cOH is the concentration of alkali in the burette and v is the titre volume. Equating the two expressions for [H+] and simplifying, the following expression is obtained

A plot of  against v will be a straight line. If E0 and s are known from electrode calibration, where the line crosses the x-axis indicates the volume at the equivalence point, . Alternatively, this plot can be used for electrode calibration by finding the values of E0 and s that give the best straight line.

Titrating strong acid with strong base 

For a strong acid-strong base titration monitored by pH, we have at any ith point in the titration

where Kw is the water autoprotolysis constant. 

If titrating an acid of initial volume  and concentration  with base of concentration  , then at any ith point in the titration with titrant volume ,

At the equivalence point, the equivalence volume . 

Thus,
 a plot of  will have a linear region before equivalence, with slope  
 and a plot of  will have a linear region after equivalence, with slope  
 both plots will have  as intercept

The pH meter is usually calibrated with buffer solutions at known pH values before starting the titration. The ionic strength can be kept constant by judicious choice of acid and base. For instance, HCl titrated with NaOH of approximately the same concentration will replace H+ with an ion (Na+) of the same charge at the same concentration, to keep the ionic strength fairly constant. Otherwise, a relatively high concentration of background electrolyte can be used, or the activity quotient can be computed.

 Titrating strong base with strong acid 

Mirror-image plots are obtained if titrating the base with the acid, and the signs of the slopes are reversed. 

Hence, 
 a plot of  will have a linear region before equivalence with slope 
 and a plot of  will have a linear region after''' equivalence with slope 
 both plots will have  as x-intercept

Figure 1 gives sample Gran plots of a strong base-strong acid titration.

 Concentrations and dissociation constants of weak acids 

The method can be used to estimate the dissociation constants of weak acids, as well as their concentrations (Gran, 1952). With an acid represented by HA, where 
 ,
we have at any ith point in the titration of a volume  of acid at a concentration  by base of concentration . In the linear regions away from equivalence, 
  and
 
are valid approximations, whence
 , or
  or, because  ,
. 
A plot of  versus  will have a slope  over the linear acidic region and an extrapolated x-intercept , from which either  or  can be computed. The alkaline region is treated in the same manner as for a titration of strong acid. Figure 2 gives an example; in this example, the two x-intercepts differ by about 0.2 mL but this is a small discrepancy, given the large equivalence volume (0.5% error). 

Similar equations can be written for the titration of a weak base by strong acid (Gran, 1952; Harris, 1998). 

 Carbonate content 
Martell and Motekaitis (1992) use the most linear regions and exploit the difference in equivalence volumes between acid-side and base-side plots during an acid-base titration to estimate the adventitious CO2 content in the base solution. This is illustrated in the sample Gran plots of Figure 1.

When the total CO2 content is significant, as in natural waters and alkaline effluents, two or three inflections can be seen in the pH-volume curves owing to buffering by higher concentrations of bicarbonate and carbonate. As discussed by Stumm and Morgan (1981), the analysis of such waters can use up to six Gran plots from a single titration to estimate the multiple end points and measure the total alkalinity and the carbonate and/or bicarbonate contents.

 Potentiometric monitoring of H+ 

Thus, as before for a titration of strong acid by strong base,
 a plot of  vs.  will have a linear region before equivalence, with slope 
 and a plot of  vs.  will have a linear region after equivalence, with slope 
 both plots will have  as intercept and, as before, the acid-side equivalence volume can be used to standardize whichever concentration is unknown, and the difference between acid-side and base-side equivalence volumes can be used to estimate the carbonate content
Analogous plots can be drawn using data from a titration of base by acid.

 Electrode calibration 

If a pH electrode is not well calibrated, an offset correction can be computed in situ from the acid-side Gran slope:
In the sample data illustrated in Figure 1, this offset correction was not insignificant, at -0.054 pH units. 

Calibration of an electrode is often performed using buffers of known pH, or by performing a titration of strong acid with strong base. For instance, Martell and Motekaitis (1992) calculated the pH value expected at the start of the titration, having earlier titrated the acid and base solutions against primary standards, then adjusted the pH electrode reading accordingly, but this does not afford a slope correction if one is needed. 

Based on earlier work by McBryde (1969), Gans and O'Sullivan (2000) describe an iterative approach to arrive at both  and  values in the relation , from a titration of strong acid by strong base: 

The procedure could in principle be modified for titrations of base by acid. A computer program named GLEE (for GLass Electrode Evaluation) implements this approach on titrations of acid by base for electrode calibration. This program additionally can compute (by a separate, non-linear least-squares process) a 'correction' for the base concentration. An advantage of this method of electrode calibration is that it can be performed in the same medium of constant ionic strength which may later be used for the determination of equilibrium constants. 

 Potentiometric monitoring of other species 

Thus, a titration of a solution of another species  by species  is analogous to a pH-monitored titration of base by acid, whence either  or  plotted versus  will have an x-intercept . The significance of the slopes will depend on the interactions between the two species, whether associating in solution or precipitating together (Gran, 1952). Usually, the only result of interest is the equivalence point. However, the before-equivalence slope could in principle be used to assess the solubility product  in the same way as  can be determined from acid-base titrations, although other ion-pair association interactions may be occurring as well.

To illustrate, consider a titration of Cl− by Ag+ monitored potentiometrically: 

Hence, 
 a plot of  will have a linear region before equivalence, with slope  
 and a plot of  will have a linear region after equivalence, with slope  
 in both plots, the x-intercept is 

Figure 3 gives sample plots of potentiometric titration data.

 Non-ideal behaviour 

In any titration lacking buffering components, both before-equivalence and beyond-equivalence plots should ideally cross the x axis at the same point. Non-ideal behaviour can result from measurement errors (e.g. a poorly calibrated electrode, an insufficient equilibration time before recording the electrode reading, drifts in ionic strength), sampling errors (e.g. low data densities in the linear regions) or an incomplete chemical model (e.g. the presence of titratable impurities such as carbonate in the base, or incomplete precipitation in potentiometric titrations of dilute solutions, for which Gran et al. (1981) propose alternate approaches). Buffle et al. (1972) discuss a number of error sources. 

However, there is disagreement among practitioners as to which data to plot, whether using only data on one side of equivalence or on both sides, and whether to select data nearest equivalence or in the most linear portions:Butler (1991) discusses the issue of data selection, and also examines interferences from titratable impurities such as borate and phosphate. using the data nearest the equivalence point will enable the two x-intercepts to be more coincident with each other and to better coincide with estimates from derivative plots, while using acid-side data in an acid-base titration presumably minimizes interference from titratable (buffering) impurities, such as bicarbonate/carbonate in the base (see Carbonate content), and the effect of a drifting ionic strength. In the sample plots displayed in the Figures, the most linear regions (the data represented by filled circles) were selected for the least-squares computations of slopes and intercepts. Data selection is always subjective. 

 References 

 Buffle, J., Parthasarathy, N. and Monnier, D. (1972): Errors in the Gran addition method. Part I. Theoretical Calculation of Statistical Errors; Anal. Chim. Acta 59, 427-438; Buffle, J. (1972): Anal. Chim. Acta 59, 439.
 Butler, J. N. (1991): Carbon Dioxide Equilibria and Their Applications; CRC Press: Boca Raton, FL.
 Butler, J. N. (1998): Ionic Equilibrium: Solubility and pH Calculations; Wiley-Interscience. Chap. 3.
 Gans, P. and O'Sullivan, B. (2000): GLEE, a new computer program for glass electrode calibration; Talanta, 51, 33–37.
 Gran, G. (1950): Determination of the equivalence point in potentiometric titrations, Acta Chemica Scandinavica, 4, 559-577.
 Gran, G. (1952): Determination of the equivalence point in potentiometric titrations—Part II, Analyst, 77, 661-671.
 Gran, G., Johansson, A. and Johansson, S. (1981): Automatic Titration by Stepwise Addition of Equal Volumes of Titrant Part VII. Potentiometric Precipitation Titrations, Analyst, 106, 1109-1118.
 Harris, D. C.: Quantitative Chemical Analysis, 5th Ed.; W.H. Freeman & Co., New. York, NY, 1998.
 Martell, A. E. and Motekaitis, R. J.: The determination and use of stability constants, Wiley-VCH, 1992.
 McBryde, W. A. E. (1969): Analyst, 94, 337.
 Rossotti, F. J. C. and Rossotti, H. (1965): J. Chem. Ed''., 42, 375
 Skoog, D. A., West, D. M., Holler, F. J. and Crouch, S. R. (2003): Fundamentals of Analytical Chemistry: An Introduction, 8th Ed., Brooks and Cole, Chap. 37.
 Stumm, W. and Morgan, J. J. (1981): Aquatic chemistry, 2nd Ed.; John Wiley & Sons, New York.

Notes 

Plots (graphics)
Analytical chemistry
Titration